Podolepis aristata  is a herb in the Asteraceae family, which is found in Western Australia, and all mainland states and territories of Australia.   

It was first described in 1837 by George Bentham, from a specimen collected on the Swan River, in Western Australia.

References

External links 
 Podolepis aristata occurrence data from the Australasian Virtual Herbarium

aristata
Flora of New South Wales
Flora of South Australia
Flora of the Northern Territory
Flora of Western Australia
Flora of Victoria (Australia)
Flora of Queensland
Plants described in 1837
Taxa named by George Bentham